Gordon Lyons (born 6 March 1986) is a Unionist politician from Northern Ireland representing the Democratic Unionist Party (DUP). Lyons has been a Member of the Northern Ireland Assembly (MLA) for East Antrim since  August 2015.

Lyons worked as an assistant to DUP Member of the Legislative Assembly Sammy Wilson for five years.  He stood unsuccessfully in East Antrim at the 2011 Northern Ireland Assembly election, and also for the Coast Road area of Larne Borough Council.

At the 2014 local elections, Lyons was elected for the Coast Road area of the new Mid and East Antrim District Council, and in August 2015, he was co-opted to take Wilson's place on the Assembly.

Lyons was re-elected at the 2016 Assembly Election and was a member of the Economy Committee and Chairman of the Committee for Procedures.

Following his re-election at the 2017 NI Assembly Election, Lyons was appointed by DUP Leader Arlene Foster as the DUP Assembly Group Chief Whip.

When devolution was restored on 11 January 2020, First Minister Arlene Foster appointed Lyons as Junior Minister in the Executive Office.

He served as the Minister of Agriculture, Environment, and Rural Affairs after Edwin Poots stood down temporarily for health reasons.

On 6 July 2021 he became Minister for the Economy after being appointed by the DUP's newly elected Leader Jeffrey Donaldson, taking over from Paul Frew.

References

1986 births
Living people
People from Larne
Members of Larne Borough Council
Democratic Unionist Party MLAs
Northern Ireland MLAs 2011–2016
Northern Ireland MLAs 2016–2017
Northern Ireland MLAs 2017–2022
Northern Ireland MLAs 2022–2027